Salina Kristin Olsson (born 29 August 1978) is a Swedish former football forward who played for the Sweden women's national football team at the 2004 Summer Olympics. At the club level, she played for Hammarby IF DFF, Djurgårdens IF and Kopparbergs/Göteborg FC.

See also
 Sweden at the 2004 Summer Olympics

References

External links
 
 
 
 

1978 births
Living people
Swedish women's footballers
Place of birth missing (living people)
Footballers at the 2004 Summer Olympics
Olympic footballers of Sweden
Women's association football forwards
Sweden women's international footballers
1999 FIFA Women's World Cup players
2003 FIFA Women's World Cup players
Damallsvenskan players
Hammarby Fotboll (women) players
Djurgårdens IF Fotboll (women) players
BK Häcken FF players
People from Huddinge Municipality
Sportspeople from Stockholm County